Sky High is a 2005 American superhero teen comedy film directed by Mike Mitchell and written by Paul Hernandez and Kim Possible creators Bob Schooley and Mark McCorkle. The film stars Michael Angarano, Danielle Panabaker, Mary Elizabeth Winstead, Kelly Preston and Kurt Russell. It also features Bruce Campbell, Cloris Leachman, Jim Rash, Steven Strait, Lynda Carter, Dave Foley and Kevin McDonald. It tells the story of Will Stronghold, the son of two superheroes who is enrolled in an airborne high school for teenage superheroes where his powers kick in; he must deal with a growing distance from his old friends, a threat from a mysterious supervillain and get the girl of his dreams.

The film was theatrically released by Buena Vista Pictures Distribution on July 29, 2005, and grossed $86.4 million worldwide against a production budget of $35 million. While it did receive generally positive reviews from critics and audiences during its original theatrical run, in the years since its release, its reputation has improved considerably, to the point of being regarded by some as a cult film.

Plot
Will Stronghold begins ninth grade at Sky High, a high school that exclusively teaches teenagers with superpowers. Will's parents are the Commander and Jetstream, some of the world's most famous superheroes. Will's best friend Layla, who has a crush on him, has the power to manipulate plant life. Will is anxious about attending Sky High, located on a floating campus reached by a flying school bus, because, unbeknownst to his parents, he has not developed any super powers. On the first day, he and the other ninth graders are harassed by a trio of bullies: Speed, a burly senior with super speed; Lash, a skinny senior with extreme flexibility; and Penny, a senior cheerleader who can clone herself. Because of his lack of powers, Will is slated to enter a curriculum for "Hero Support" and becomes a sidekick. His classmates include Ethan, who melts into a fluid; Zach, who glows in the dark; Magenta, who transforms into a guinea pig; and Layla, who joins the class in protest against the school's two-track education system. The class is taught by the Commander's former sidekick, "All American Boy."

Will learns that in rare cases, such as that of the bus driver Ron Wilson, the child of two super-powered parents does not develop any powers. The Commander is unaware that his son has been relegated to Hero Support and shows Will his hidden trophy room. He is particularly proud of the mysterious weapon, "The Pacifier," which he took from his science-themed nemesis, Royal Pain, years ago. Unknown to either of them, Royal Pain, who had been presumed dead, watches the exchange from a hidden camera in one of the other trophies. As Will settles into Sky High and makes friends with the other sidekicks, he comes into conflict with pyrokinetic student Warren Peace, whose supervillain father was imprisoned by the Commander. During a fight between the two, Will demonstrates super strength, impressing Gwen Grayson, a beautiful and popular "technopath" who controls machines with her mind. Will is subsequently transferred to the "Hero" track and begins spending more time with Gwen and her clique of friends, ignoring the sidekicks and Layla, who reveals to Warren that she has loved Will for a long time. On the day before the Homecoming dance, Gwen tricks Will into throwing a party at his house, and uses Speed to steal the Pacifier when she seduces Will into showing her the Secret Sanctum. After Gwen lies to Layla, who shows up to investigate the noise and believes the lie, Will breaks up with Gwen, refusing to attend the dance, even though his parents were invited as honored guests. Later, he looks through his father's old yearbook and sees a student who resembles Gwen. Believing that the student is Royal Pain and that Gwen is her daughter, he rushes to the dance with Ron’s help.

At the dance, Gwen reveals that she is actually Royal Pain. During her previous confrontation with the Commander, the Pacifier, which is meant to turn its target into an infant, malfunctioned, turning her into a baby instead, thus faking her suspected death. She has since waited sixteen years for revenge. With the help of Speed, Lash, and Penny, she takes over the school and uses the Pacifier to turn the faculty and students into infants. After returning to school, Will apologizes to Layla and teams up with Warren, the sidekicks, and Ron to try to save the day. The sidekicks demonstrate their heroism after Royal Pain sabotages the school's anti-gravity drive and their powers come in handy restarting it. Meanwhile, Will discovers that he has Jetstream's power of flight when he is thrown off the edge of the school grounds and must prevent the campus from falling. Gwen and her henchmen are defeated and arrested, and the faculty and students are returned to their proper ages. Will and Layla kiss, and a voiceover at the end reveals that they become a couple, he and Warren became best friends, and Ron Wilson gained superhuman powers after falling into a vat of toxic waste, thus becoming a superhero.

Cast
 Michael Angarano as William "Will" Theodore Stronghold, a freshman at Sky High, whose parents are two famous superheroes — Commander and Jetstream — as well as Maxville's top real estate agents in their secret identities. His super strength, inherited from his father, and his ability to fly, inherited from his mother, start as inactive and gradually manifest over the film.
 Kurt Russell as Steve Stronghold / The Commander, Will's father who is one of the world's strongest superheroes, displaying superhuman strength and invulnerability, and is a successful businessman in his secret identity.
 Kelly Preston as Josie DeMarco-Stronghold / Jetstream, Will's mother and a successful real estate agent. As Jetstream, she uses the power of supersonic flight; she is also touted as being an expert in hand-to-hand combat.
 Danielle Panabaker as Layla Williams, Will's childhood best friend and later girlfriend, who is a pacifist and can animate and control plant life. 
 Mary Elizabeth Winstead as Gwendolyn "Gwen" Grayson / Royal Pain / Susan "Sue" Tenny, a technopathic senior at Sky High whom Will, along with everyone else, falls in love with. Winstead said of her role, "I bounced around. I was either the hero of the sidekicks or the sidekick to the heroes." When she attended Sky High the first time, no one understood her class of powers and she was slated as a sidekick and a weirdo, eventually turning into a supervillain. An accident with the "Pacifier" de-aged her during a battle with the Commander.
 Patrick Warburton provides the voice of Gwen in her Royal Pain suit.
 Steven Strait as Warren Peace, the pyrokinetic son of supervillain Baron Battle, who is in jail with four life sentences, and an unnamed superhero mother.
 Dee Jay Daniels as Ethan Bank / Popsicle, a sidekick and one of Will's friends, who can melt into a fluid.
 Kelly Vitz as Magenta "Maj" Lewis, one of Will's sidekick friends, who can shapeshift into a guinea pig with purple highlights and streaks in her fur similar to those in her human hair.
 Nicholas Braun as Zachary "Zach" Braun / Zack Attack, a sidekick Will's childhood friend, who has the ability to glow in the dark.
 Malika Haqq and Khadijah Haqq as Penny Lent, Gwen's athletic best friend, who can duplicate herself.
 Jake Sandvig as Lash, a skinny bully at Sky High who has elasticity.
 Will Harris as Speed, an overweight bully at Sky High who can move at superhuman speeds.
 Lynda Carter as Principal Powers, the principal of Sky High.
 Bruce Campbell as Tommy Boomowski / Coach Boomer / Sonic Boom, the gym teacher at Sky High who has can release sonic waves from his vocal cords.
 Kevin Heffernan as Ron Wilson, Sky High's good-hearted bus driver. He is the son of two superheroes, but does not have any powers.
 Cloris Leachman as Nurse Spex, Sky High's elderly, eccentric but kind school nurse, who has the ability of x-ray vision.
 Jim Rash as Mr. Grayson / Stitches, Royal Pain's cackling sidekick, who raised her as his daughter after she was turned into a baby by the Pacifier.
 Dave Foley as Mr. Jonathan Boy / All-American Boy, the Commander's former sidekick who works as Hero Support teacher at Sky High.
 Kevin McDonald as Professor Medulla, the Mad Science teacher with an oversized brain, which grants him advanced intelligence, creativity, and a multitude of genius-level skills.
 Tom Kenny and Jill Talley as Mr. and Mrs. Chester Timmerman, a couple who witnesses Will prevent Sky High from falling on their new home.
 Loren Berman as "Big" Larry, a socially awkward student who can turn into a giant, muscular rock monster at will.
 Dustin Ingram as Carbon Copy Kid, a student that can shapeshift to look like anyone.
 Nicole Malgarini as Freeze Girl, a student with cryokinetic powers.

Production

Exterior shots of the Sky High school were filmed at the Oviatt Library at California State University in Northridge in late 2004.

In between working on the first and second seasons of the animated series Kim Possible, creators Bob Schooley and Mark McCorkle had begun writing a script for a live-action adaptation, which ultimately never came to fruition. Impressed with their work, the filmmakers asked them to look into re-writing the script for Sky High, which had been previously shelved. McCorkle believes they were recruited for Sky High because "they liked the idea of a superhero high school. I think, reading how we wrote teens in Kim Possible, they felt like, 'This feels good and contemporary, and maybe you can apply that to this project for us.' Similar to Kim Possible, Schooley and McCorkle wrote Sky High to be equally appealing to both children and adults. According to scifi.com, Disney was attracted by the "original concept" of "children of superheroes going to high school", originally conceived by screenwriter Paul Hernandez in the 1990s.

After recruiting Schooley and McCorkle to update Hernandez's script (they only wrote the beginning and ending sequences) Disney hired several comedians such as Kevin McDonald, Dave Foley, and Kevin Heffernan for supporting roles. For the main roles, the casting was a mix of established and new teenage actors: while Michael Angarano and Mary Elizabeth Winstead were already successful, Danielle Panabaker was little-known and former model Steven Strait was hired after his first audition ever.

Director Mike Mitchell said that Sky High functions on two premises: "the adults are all insane" and "the girls are smarter than the boys": the adults portrayed in the film tend to be caricatured, while the teenage girls are written as more assertive and powerful than the boys. The film also employed extensive usage of Dutch angles. For the treatment of the teenage actors, Mitchell also stated that the actors all had their own trailers and were generally kept separated, because "we did not want them to date after the second week and break up after the fourth", which would have made filming difficult.

Mitchell, a science fiction fan, admitted that this project "was a dream", because it brought him together with four of his favorite SF cult heroes: Wonder Woman actress Lynda Carter), Snake Plissken actor Kurt Russell, Ash Williams actor Bruce Campbell, and Cloris Leachman, who earned fame as Frau Blücher in Young Frankenstein.

Music

The soundtrack album for the film was released by Hollywood Records on July 26, 2005, and is composed of covers of songs from the 1980s (with the exception of "Just What I Needed", which was from 1978). While none of the film's score, composed by Michael Giacchino, was included on the album, a limited edition of his score was released by Intrada Records in 2017.

 Track listing
 "I Melt with You" – Bowling for Soup (Originally by: Modern English) - 4:03
 "Through Being Cool" – They Might Be Giants (Originally by: Devo) - 3:17
 "Save It for Later" – Flashlight Brown (Originally by: The Beat) - 2:49
 "Everybody Wants to Rule the World" – Christian Burns (Originally by: Tears for Fears) - 4:28
 "One Thing Leads to Another" – Steven Strait (Originally by: The Fixx) - 3:10
 "Lies" – The Click Five (Originally by: Thompson Twins) - 2:58
 "Voices Carry" – Vitamin C (Originally by: 'Til Tuesday) - 4:16
 "Please, Please, Please, Let Me Get What I Want" – Elefant (Originally by: The Smiths) - 2:53
 "True" – Cary Brothers (Originally by: Spandau Ballet) - 5:11
 "Just What I Needed" – Caleigh Peters (Originally by: The Cars) - 3:38
 "Can't Stop the World" – Ginger Sling (Originally by: The Go-Go's) - 3:25
 "And She Was" – Keaton Simons (Originally by: Talking Heads) - 3:49
 "Twist and Crawl" – Skindred (Originally by: The Beat) - 2:31

Reception
AllMusic rated the album 2.5/5, saying that it "stumbles more than it succeeds" and is "painfully conventional."

Reception

Box office 
On an estimated budget of US$35 million, the film grossed just under $64 million in the US, and another $22 million internationally, bringing the total to $86 million.

Critical response
The site's critical consensus states: "This highly derivative superhero coming-of-age flick is moderately entertaining, family-friendly fluff." On Metacritic the film has a weighted average score of 62 based on reviews from 29 critics, indicating "generally favorable reviews". Audiences surveyed by CinemaScore gave the film a grade A− on a scale of A+ to F.

Joe Leydon of Variety magazine praised the film calling it: "Smartly written and sprightly played, Sky High satisfies with a clever commingling of spoofy superheroics, school-daze hijinks" and "this lively live-action Disney release stands on its own merits as a tongue-in-cheek fantasy with cross-generational appeal."
Neil Smith at BBC.com wrote: "While originality is hardly the film's strongest suit, its agreeable mix of knowing spoof and kid-pleasing fantasy makes it considerably more engaging than some of the 'straight' superhero blockbusters we've suffered recently."

Over the years, Sky High has both been received more favorably and has also maintained a solid cult fanbase; particularly due to its lighthearted homage of normal superhero tropes.  Mark Harrison, writer for Den of Geek, summarized, “With a cast made up of bright young things and cult favourites and a script that goes post-modern without ever getting arch or snarky, Sky High is a real gem from Disney’s live action catalogue. It borrows from JK Rowling, John Hughes, Joss Whedon and any number of comic books and yet still stands on its own. Next to the current superhero boom, it was so ahead of its time that a decade later, it seems sharper and funnier than ever.”

See also
 Hero High
 PS238
 Zoom
 My Hero Academia
 Up, Up and Away

References

External links

 
 
 
 
 
 

2005 films
2005 action comedy films
2005 romantic comedy films
2000s teen comedy films
2000s superhero comedy films
American action comedy films
Child superheroes
Films directed by Mike Mitchell
American coming-of-age films
American romantic comedy films
American science fiction thriller films
American high school films
Walt Disney Pictures films
American superhero films
Teen superhero comedy films
Films scored by Michael Giacchino
Films set in 2004
American films about revenge
Superhero schools
American children's comedy films
2000s English-language films
2000s American films
Films about shapeshifting